Frank Cellier (23 February 1884 – 27 September 1948) was an English actor. Early in his career, from 1903 to 1920, he toured in Britain, Germany, the West Indies, America and South Africa. In the 1920s, he became known in the West End for Shakespearean character roles, among others, and also directed some plays in which he acted. He continued to act on stage until 1946. During the 1930s and 1940s, he also appeared in more than three dozen films.

Biography

Early years
François Cellier, always known as Frank, was born in Surbiton, Surrey, the only son of the conductor François Cellier and his wife, Clara née Short. He had five sisters and was educated at Cranleigh School. After leaving school, he spent three years in business.

In 1903, Cellier made his first stage appearance as Clement Hale in Arthur Wing Pinero's Sweet Lavender at the Town Hall in Reigate and thereafter made acting his career, also doing some stage manager work. In the autumn of that year he went on tour with William Poel's company in Doctor Faustus, and later toured in a number of Shakespearean roles in the company of Ian Maclaren. He then extended his repertory in a wide variety of roles which he undertook on tour with the actress Florence Nellie Glossop-Harris (d. 1932), daughter of the actor-manager Augustus Harris, whom he married in 1910. She divorced him in 1925. They had a daughter, Antoinette, who became an actress and married actor Bruce Seton, He also has a son, Peter, who is a TV, theatre and film actor.

Cellier toured not only in Britain, but in Germany and the West Indies, and did not make his debut in London until 1914, when under his own management he appeared in Cheer, Boys, Cheer. After this he toured in America and South Africa, and did not appear again in London until 1920. "By this time," wrote The Times, "his solid merit was appreciated after his long and arduous apprenticeship."

Shakespearean and other stage roles
Once established, Cellier pursued a career balancing new commercial plays –
sometimes farce, often murder drama – and classical roles. His favourite part was Hamlet, and his other Shakespeare roles included Apemantus in Timon of Athens, the title role in Henry IV, Part 2, Cassio in Othello, Touchstone in As You Like It, Angelo in Measure for Measure, Ford in The Merry Wives of Windsor, Quince in A Midsummer Night's Dream and Kent in King Lear. Two of his most celebrated roles were in The Merchant of Venice and Twelfth Night, of which The Times said, "while he could wring the last drop of dramatic tension from the role of Shylock, he could also play Sir Toby Belch in such a way as to bring out the essence of the comedy without suggesting that the old reprobate had never known better days."

In the West End, he directed and played in numerous plays. His roles in these included the Nobleman in The Man with a Load of Mischief (1925), one of Marie Tempest's suitors in Noël Coward's The Marquise (1927), Sir Peter Teazle in The School for Scandal (1929) and the King in the Improper Duchess (1931). He starred in The Duchess of Dantzic in 1932 and directed and appeared in The Mask of Virtue (1935) with Vivien Leigh. He also appeared that year in Espionage, a play by Walter C. Hackett, at the Apollo Theatre. His final stage role was the father in Terence Rattigan's The Winslow Boy in 1946, which he played to great praise in London and was due to take to America but was prevented by ill-health from doing so.

Films and death
Beginning in the 1930s, Cellier played roles in films, including Sheriff Watson in Alfred Hitchcock's The 39 Steps (1935). He was also Monsieur Barsac in the comedy film The Guv'nor (1935).

Cellier died in London in 1948 aged 64. His widow was his second wife, actress Phyllis Shannaw. Actor Peter Cellier is their son.

Filmography

 Gloria (1916) - Louis Martino
 Her Reputation (1931) - Henry Sloane
 Tin Gods (1932) - Major Drake
 The Golden Cage (1933) - Julian Sande
 Soldiers of the King (1933) - Col. Philip Markham
 Doss House (1933) - Editor
 The Song You Gave Me (1933) - Golf Club Patron (uncredited)
 Colonel Blood (1934) - Col. Blood
 The Fire Raisers (1934) - Brent
 Jew Süss (1934) - (uncredited)
 Lorna Doone (1934) - Capt. Jeremy Stickles
 The Dictator (1935) - Sir Murray Keith
 The 39 Steps (1935) - Sheriff Watson
 The Passing of the Third Floor Back (1935) - Wright
 The Guv'nor (1935) - Barsac
 Rhodes of Africa (1936) - Barney Barnato
 Tudor Rose (1936) - Henry VIII
 The Man Who Changed His Mind (1936) - Lord Haslewood / Clayton
 O.H.M.S. (1937) - Regimental Sergeant-Major Briggs
 Action for Slander (1937) - Sir Bernard Roper
 Take My Tip (1937) - Paradine
 Non-Stop New York (1937) - Sam Pryor
 Victoria the Great (1937) - Minor Role (uncredited)
 Kate Plus Ten (1938) - Sir Ralph Sapson
 A Royal Divorce (1938) - Talleyrand
 Sixty Glorious Years (1938) - Lord Derby
 The Ware Case (1938) - Skinner
 The Spider (1940) - Julian Ismay
 The Midas Touch (1940) - Corris Morgan
 Love on the Dole (1941) - Sam Grundy
 Quiet Wedding (1941) - Mr. Clayton
 Cottage to Let (1941) - John Forest
 Jeannie (1941) - Man Who Has Lost His Keys (uncredited)
 Ships with Wings (1942) - Gen. Scarappa
 The Black Sheep of Whitehall (1942) - Innsbach
 The Big Blockade (1942) - German: Schneider
 Give Us the Moon  (1944) - Pyke
 Quiet Weekend (1946) - Adrian Barrasford
 The Magic Bow (1946) - Antonio
 Easy Money (1948) - Manager (segment The Teddy Ball Story)
 The Blind Goddess (1948) - The Judge (final film role)

Notes

External links

Cellier family
English male film actors
English people of French descent
1884 births
1948 deaths
People educated at Cranleigh School
People from Surbiton
20th-century English male actors
English male stage actors
English theatre directors
Male actors from Surrey